Zogota is a town in southeastern Guinea.

Mining
It is the site of large iron ore deposits. Initial production proposed for 2012 is 2mtpa. The mine is owned by BSG Resources.

The mine will be connected by a standard gauge railway across the border to a port in Liberia.

See also
 Iron ore in Africa
 Railway stations in Guinea

References

 

Populated places in Guinea